The 1998 Miller Lite 200 was the thirteenth round of the 1998 CART FedEx Champ Car World Series season, held on August 9, 1998, at the Mid-Ohio Sports Car Course in Lexington, Ohio. The race was notable for many crashes, including one involving Michael Andretti and P. J. Jones that sent the former into a series of barrel rolls, although he walked out unhurt. It was won by Adrián Fernández, his third career win and second of the season and giving Ford Cosworth their 300th career win. Also this marks the 88th and final podium for Bobby Rahal.

Classification

Race 

Notes
 – Alex Zanardi finished 12th, which would usually yield 1 point, but race officials docked him of the point for dangerous driving.

Caution flags

Lap Leaders

Point standings after race

References 

Miller Lite 200
Miller Lite 200
Indy 200 at Mid-Ohio